"I Don't Want to Be Here Anymore" is a song by American rock band Rise Against. The song was released as the lead single from their seventh album, titled The Black Market on June 10, 2014, and was sent to radio the same day. It debuted at #22 on the Alternative Songs chart and peaked at #5 on the Mainstream Rock chart.

Music video
A music video for the song was released on July 23, 2014. A lyric video for the song was released on June 10, 2014.

Charts

Weekly charts

Year-end charts

References

Rise Against songs
2014 singles
2014 songs
Interscope Records singles